LGBT-related films released in the 1960s are listed in the following articles:
 List of LGBT-related films of 1960
 List of LGBT-related films of 1961
 List of LGBT-related films of 1962
 List of LGBT-related films of 1963
 List of LGBT-related films of 1964
 List of LGBT-related films of 1965
 List of LGBT-related films of 1966
 List of LGBT-related films of 1967
 List of LGBT-related films of 1968
 List of LGBT-related films of 1969

 
1960s
20th-century LGBT-related films